The North-West Frontier Province referendum was held in July 1947 to decide whether the North-West Frontier Province (NWFP) of British India would join the Dominion of India or Pakistan upon the Partition of India. The polling began on 6 July and the results were made public on 20 July. Out of the total population of 4 million in the NWFP, only 572,798 were eligible to vote, of whom only 51.00% voted in the referendum. 289,244 (99.02%) of the votes were cast in favor of Pakistan and only 2,874 (0.98%) in favor of India.

The NWFP Chief Minister Khan Abdul Jabbar Khan (Dr. Khan Sahib), his brother Abdul Ghaffar Khan, and the Khudai Khidmatgars boycotted the referendum, citing that it did not have the options of the NWFP becoming independent or joining Afghanistan. Their appeal for boycott had an effect, as according to an estimate, the total turnout for the referendum was 15% lower than the total turnout in the 1946 elections.

Background

On 20 February 1947, Mountbatten was charged by the British Prime Minister Clement Attlee as Viceroy and Governor-General of India to oversee the transition of power in British India to Indians, by no later than 30 June 1948. Mountbatten's instructions from the government were to avoid partition and preserve a united India as a result of the transfer of power. He was, however, authorized to adapt to a changing situation in order to get the British out promptly with minimal reputational damage. Soon after he arrived, Mountbatten concluded that the situation in India was too volatile to wait even for a year before granting independence to India. Although his advisers favored a gradual transfer of independence, Mountbatten decided the only way forward was a quick and orderly transfer of independence within 1947. In his view, any longer would mean civil war. During his visit to the North-West Frontier Province on 28–29 April 1947, Mountbatten declared that a referendum would be held to decide the future of the province. On 2 June, Mountbatten presented his famous 3rd June Plan for the partition of British India, which included a provision for the referendum in the North-West Frontier Province. The All-India Muslim League and the Indian National Congress accepted the plan, but Abdul Ghaffar Khan, his Khudai Khidmatgar movement, and the All India Azad Muslim Conference, who were opposed to partition, opposed the plan.

On 21 June, Mirzali Khan (Faqir of Ipi), Abdul Ghaffar Khan, and other Khudai Khidmatgars declared the Bannu Resolution, demanding that the Pashtuns be given a choice to have an independent state of Pashtunistan composing all Pashtun majority territories of British India, instead of being made to join the new dominions of India or Pakistan. However, the British Raj refused to comply with the demand of the Bannu Resolution and only the options for Pakistan and India were given. In response, Abdul Ghaffar Khan and his elder brother Chief Minister Dr. Khan Sahib boycotted the referendum on joining India or Pakistan, citing that it did not have the options for the province to become independent or join Afghanistan.

Administration
According to a letter issued by the Indian Army General Headquarter on 18 June 1947, the following eight military officers were selected by the government to assist the Referendum Commissioner in the referendum: Lt. Col. O.H. Mitchell, Lt. Col. V.W. Tregear, Lt. Col. R.W. Niva, Lt. Col. M.W.H. White, Lt. Col. G.M. Strover, Lt. Col. W.I. Moberley, Lt. Col. R.O.L.D. Byrene, and Maj. E. de G.H. Bromhead. Some civilians were also included at the lower level of the referendum machinery under a close supervision of British Indian Army personnel.

Mountbatten instructed the NWFP acting Governor Rob Lockhart that "each side should have equal
facilities in the matter of the supply of petrol." Amnesty was granted to political prisoners, except those charged with serious crimes. Mountbatten met the leaders of the All-India Muslim League and the Indian National Congress, and the following election charter was declared:
It is desirable that in this referendum: a). Electioneering speeches, which can only lead to bloodshed should as far as possible be avoided; and b). The issue should be clearly put before the voters.
To achieve these objects, it has been suggested: a). That electioneering speeches should by agreement between the parties, be banned; and b). That election posters should be prepared containing side by side and in very simple and agreed language, the issue what the two future Dominions will be and the respective advantages they have to offer to the NWFP. A map should be printed showing the areas of the two dominions.

Result
Although the voter turnout was low (51.00%), 99.02% of the votes were in favor of joining with the Majority of the votes coming from Hazara, Pakistan which represented 50.50% of the total electorate. The turnout was lowest among non-Muslims (1.16%). Among the Pashtuns of rural constituencies, the turnout was low in the districts of Mardan (41.56%) and Peshawar (41.68%), strongholds of the Khudai Khidmatgar movement which boycotted the referendum in favor of demanding a choice to form an independent Pashtunistan or joining Afghanistan. The turnout was highest in Hazara (76.22%), a stronghold of the All-India Muslim League which campaigned for Pakistan.

Aftermath
The NWFP was merged into the newly created Dominion of Pakistan on 15 August 1947. The elected provincial government of Khan Abdul Jabbar Khan (Dr. Khan Sahib) was terminated on 22 August 1947 by Muhammad Ali Jinnah, the Governor-General of Pakistan. A Muslim League leader, Abdul Qayyum Khan Kashmiri, was installed as the new Chief Minister of the North-West Frontier Province on 23 August 1947. The new provincial government imprisoned the Khudai Khidmatgar movement's leader Abdul Ghaffar Khan, as well as the deposed Chief Minister Dr. Khan Sahib, and some other notable figures of the region. In July 1948, the British governor of the North-West Frontier Province, Ambrose Flux Dundas, enforced an ordinance which authorized the provincial government to detain anyone and confiscate their property without giving a reason. The Babrra massacre, in which over 600 Khudai Khidmatgar supporters were killed, happened on 12 August 1948. In mid-September 1948, the Pakistani government banned the Khudai Khidmatgar movement, who had boycotted the 1947 NWFP referendum, and many of their supporters were arrested. The provincial government destroyed the center of the Khudai Khidmatgar movement at Sardaryab, Charsadda District.

See also
Durand Line
Pashtunistan
1947 Sylhet referendum
Afghanistan–Pakistan Confederation plan

References

1947 referendums
States and territories established in 1947
Partition of India
1947 in British India
History of Khyber Pakhtunkhwa (1947–present)
Referendums in India
July 1947 events in Asia